The 21st Awit Awards were held on November 26, 2008, at the Eastwood Central Plaza located in Eastwood City, Quezon City. They gave excellences to the best of Filipino music for the year 2007.

Bamboo received the most nominations with thirteen. Julianne followed with twelve while Jonathan Manalo received ten nods.

The awards ceremony was broadcast live through myx website. The pre-show was hosted by Richard Poon and Sitti while the main show was hosted by Christian Bautista and Nikki Gil. Yeng Constantino and Civ Fontanilla won most of the awards with five.

Winners and nominees
Winners are listed first and highlighted in bold. Nominated producers, composers and lyricists are not included in this list, unless noted. For the full list, please go to their official website.

Performance Awards

Creativity Awards

Technical Achievement Awards

People's Choice Awards

Special Awards

Performers
This is in order of appearance.

References

External links
 Official Website of the Awit Awards

Awit Awards
2008 music awards
2008 in Philippine music